Frank William George Lloyd (2 February 1886 – 10 August 1960) was a British-born American film director, actor, scriptwriter, and producer. He was among the founders of the Academy of Motion Picture Arts and Sciences, and was its president from 1934 to 1935.

Biography
Lloyd was born in Glasgow, Scotland. His mother Jane was Scottish and his father Edmund was Welsh. Lloyd started his career as a singer and stage actor in London. He is Scotland's first Academy Award winner and is unique in film history, having received three Oscar nominations in 1929 for his work on a silent film (The Divine Lady), a part-talkie (Weary River) and a full talkie (Drag). He won for The Divine Lady. He was nominated and won again in 1933 for his adaptation of Noël Coward's Cavalcade and received a further Best Director nomination in 1935 for perhaps his most successful film, Mutiny on the Bounty. Lloyd is credited with being a founder of the Academy of Motion Picture Arts & Sciences.

In 1957, he was awarded the George Eastman Award, given by George Eastman House for distinguished contribution to the art of film.

On 8 February 1960, Lloyd received a star on the Hollywood Walk of Fame for his contributions to the motion pictures industry, at 6667 Hollywood Boulevard.

Personal life
Frank Lloyd was married to actress Alma Haller from 11 July 1913, until her death on 16 March 1952. By 1955, Lloyd married Virginia Kellogg, and remained married until Lloyd's death on 10 August 1960 at age 74. Lloyd was buried at Forest Lawn Memorial Park in Glendale, California.

Selected filmography

Damon and Pythias (1914) (actor)
 The Test (1914) (actor) (short)
 The Spy (1914) (actor)
 The Opened Shutters (1914) (actor)
The Black Box (1915) (actor)
The Gentleman from Indiana (1915)
Jane (1915)
The Reform Candidate (1915)
 Sins of Her Parent (1916)
The Tongues of Men (1916)
The Code of Marcia Gray (1916)
The Intrigue (1916)
David Garrick (1916)
The Call of the Cumberlands (1916)
Madame la Presidente (1916)
The Making of Maddalena (1916)
An International Marriage (1916)
The Stronger Love (1916)
Sins of Her Parent (1916)
The World and the Woman (1916)
A Tale of Two Cities (1917)
The Kingdom of Love (1917)
The Heart of a Lion (1917)
Les Miserables (1917)
When a Man Sees Red (1917)
American Methods (1917)
The Price of Silence (1917)
The Rainbow Trail (1918)
For Freedom (1918)
Riders of the Purple Sage (1918)
The Blindness of Divorce (1918)
The Loves of Letty (1919)
The World and Its Woman (1919)
Pitfalls of a Big City (1919)
The Man Hunter (1919)
Madame X (1920)
The Silver Horde (1920)
The Woman in Room 13 (1920)
 The Great Lover (1920)
The Invisible Power (1921)
 The Grim Comedian (1921)
The Man from Lost River (1921)
Roads of Destiny (1921)
Oliver Twist (1922)
The Eternal Flame (1922)
The Sin Flood (1922)
Black Oxen (1923)
The Voice from the Minaret (1923)
Within the Law (1923)
Ashes of Vengeance (1923)
The Sea Hawk (1924)
The Silent Watcher (1924)
Her Husband's Secret (1925)
The Splendid Road (1925)
Winds of Chance (1925)
The Wise Guy (1926)
The Eagle of the Sea (1926)
Children of Divorce (1927)
Adoration (1928)
The Divine Lady (1929)
 Young Nowheres (1929)
Weary River (1929)
Drag (1929)
Dark Streets (1929)
The Lash (1930)
The Way of All Men (1930)
The Age for Love (1931)
East Lynne (1931)
A Passport to Hell (1932)
Cavalcade (1933)
Berkeley Square (1933)
Hoop-La (1933)
Servants' Entrance (1934)
Mutiny on the Bounty (1935)
Under Two Flags (1936)
Wells Fargo (1937)
Maid of Salem (1937)
If I Were King (1938)
Rulers of the Sea (1939)
The Howards of Virginia (1940)
This Woman is Mine (1941)
The Lady from Cheyenne (1941)
The Spoilers (1942) (producer)
Forever and a Day (1943)
Blood on the Sun (1945)
The Shanghai Story (1954)
The Last Command (1955)

References

External links

 
 Frank Lloyd Films website, includes additional biographical information

1886 births
1960 deaths
Film people from Glasgow
Academy of Motion Picture Arts and Sciences founders
Presidents of the Academy of Motion Picture Arts and Sciences
Best Directing Academy Award winners
Scottish film directors
Scottish film producers
Scottish screenwriters
Scottish male film actors
Scottish male silent film actors
Burials at Forest Lawn Memorial Park (Glendale)
Scottish emigrants to the United States
20th-century British screenwriters
20th-century Scottish businesspeople